The name Jacobellis may call to mind:

Jacobellis v. Ohio, a United States Supreme Court decision of 1964 on obscenity
Lindsey Jacobellis, a 2022 Olympic gold-medalist snowboarder